Manuele is both a given name and a surname. Notable people with the name include:

 Manuele Blasi (born 1980), Italian footballer
 Manuele Mori (born 1980), Italian professional road bicycle racer
 Elena Manuele (born 2003), Italian singer

See also
 Manual (disambiguation)
 Manuel (disambiguation)
 Manuelle